Ríkharður Jónsson (12 November 1929 – 14 February 2017) was an Icelandic football player and manager.

He made his debut for the Icelandic national team in 1947, and got 33 caps and 17 goals until 1965.
This made him top goalscorer of the national team. In 2006 the record was equalled by Eiður Guðjohnsen. In 2007, it was broken. After his playing career he also became coach of the national football team from 1969 to 1971. He also managed ÍA Akranes.

He played for Fram and ÍA Akranes.

Ríkharður died on 14 February 2017, aged 87.

Honours
 Top goalscorer award Icelandic League 1955 (while playing for ÍA Akranes).

References

Jonsson, Rikhardur
Jonsson, Rikhardur|Jonsson, Rikhardur
People from Akranes
Icelandic footballers
Iceland international footballers
Knattspyrnufélagið Fram players
Íþróttabandalag Akraness players
Icelandic football managers
Iceland national football team managers
Íþróttabandalag Akraness managers
Knattspyrnudeild Keflavík managers
Jonsson, Rikhardur